The 33rd Goya Awards ceremony, presented by the Academy of Cinematographic Arts and Sciences (AACCE), honored the best in Spanish films of 2018 and took place at the Conference and Exhibition Centre of Seville on 2 February 2019. The ceremony was televised in Spain by the Spanish public television (TVE) and was hosted by television presenter and comedian Andreu Buenafuente and actress Silvia Abril. It was also televised for the international public by the TVE Internacional channel. It was the second time that the ceremony was held outside of Madrid, the other one being the 14th edition that took place in Barcelona.

Nominations were announced on 12 December 2018 by Paco León and Rossy de Palma. The Realm received the most nominations with thirteen, followed by Champions with eleven nominations.

Champions won Best Film, as well as Best New Actor and Best Original Song, but The Realm won the most awards, with seven awards, including Best Director, Best Actor, Best Supporting Actor, and Best Original Screenplay.

Winners and nominees 
The winners and nominees are listed as follows

Major awards

Other award nominees

Honorary Goya
 Narciso Ibáñez Serrador

Performances
The following artists performed musical performances.

In Memoriam
In Memoriam segment was introduced by James Rhodes, who played Adagio from Concerto No 3 in D minor, BWV 974, from Bach. The segment included:

References

External links
Official site

33
2018 film awards
2018 in Spanish cinema
2019 in Andalusia
February 2019 events in Spain
Events in Seville